Norway Lake may refer to:

 Norway Lake Township, Kandiyohi County, Minnesota
 Norway Lake Township, North Dakota, in Wells County, North Dakota

Township name disambiguation pages